Lissopterus hyadessi is a species of beetles in the family Carabidae.

References

Migadopinae
Insects described in 1885
Taxa named by Léon Fairmaire